Maccabi Haifa Basketball Club known for sponsorship reasons as Maccabi Next Urban Haifa  is a professional basketball club based in the city of Haifa in Israel. It is the basketball section of the Maccabi Haifa association. The team plays in the Liga Leumit (the second tier of Israeli basketball) and internationally in the Balkan International Basketball League. The team currently plays in the Romema Arena, which is home to 5,000 spectators, the club plays in the arena alongside fellow rivals Hapoel Haifa.

Maccabi Haifa would win its first ever Premier League title in 2013 season as they would go on and defeat perennial champions Maccabi Tel Aviv in the Premier League final.

History

1950s

Maccabi Haifa basketball Club was established in 1954 in the port city of Haifa in the Mutasarrifate of Jerusalem Maccabi Haifa, known as "The Greens," is one of the oldest basketball teams in Israel, and is one of the original eight teams that formed the top division in 1953. The club would struggle its first years of existence as they would fail to achieve a winning record in its first five seasons in the league and eventually were relegated in 1960.

1960s

Maccabi Haifa would make their return to the Premier League in 1961 as they would stay in the Premier League for the majority of the decade, though the club would undergo many ups and downs through the 1960s. The team would finish the 1967 season with a winning record, their first in club history.

1970s

The 1970s would see Maccabi Haifa struggle again in the Premier League. In 1971, the club would reach the Israeli Basketball State Cup finals were they would lose to champions Maccabi Tel Aviv. Maccabi Haifa would qualify for international competition for the first time in club history in the form of the 1971–72 FIBA European Cup Winners' Cup, the team would be eliminated in the first round by French side Denain Voltaire. Maccabi Haifa would once again suffer relegation in 1974, however, this would be short lived as the club would return to the Premier League the following season. Maccabi Haifa wouldn’t escape relegation for long, however, as the club would yet again suffer relegation in 1978.

1980s

The 1980s would be a much more stable decade for Maccabi Haifa basketball. After a two year absence, the club made their return to the Premier League in 1980, were they would maintain form and stay altogether in the Premier League for the entire decade. Maccabi Haifa would qualify for the Premier League playoffs for the first time in 1984. In 1985, the club would once again reach the finals of the State Cup, before losing once again to Maccabi Tel Aviv. Maccabi Haifa made their return back to international competition participating in the 1985–86 FIBA European Cup Winners' Cup, the team would defeat Cypriot side ENAD in the first round before falling to Yugoslav side Jugoplastika. Maccabi Haifa would qualify for the 1987–88 FIBA Korać Cup were the club would defeat Cypriot side Achilleas Kaimakli in the first round before being eliminated by French side ASVEL in the second round. Koren Amisha would be named the winner of the 1990 Israeli League Rising Star.

1990s

Despite optimism from the 1980s, the 1990s would prove to be a disastrous era for Maccabi Haifa. The team would qualify for the 1992–93 FIBA Korać Cup were they were eliminated in the second round by French side Gravelines. Maccabi Haifa tenure in the Premier League would come to an end in 1993, as the club would end up facing relegation. Despite this, Gary Alexander would lead the league in total rebounds per game. The misfortunes kept continuing as the club would last three seasons in the National League before being relegated yet again to the third tier. The club would be able to achieve back-to-back promotions to the National League and the Premier League. The club returned to international competition in the form of the 1999–2000 FIBA Korać Cup were the club would defeat Cypriot side Keravnos Keo in the first round, the club would also top their group in the second round  and advance to the playoffs were they would be eliminated by Italian side Pepsi Rimini.

2000s

The 2000s would see drastic changes to Maccabi Haifa. In 2000, Haifa mayor Amram Mitzna merged Maccabi Haifa with Hapoel Haifa to form a new club called B.C. Haifa. The 2000–01 Premier League season would see the team finish the season in fourth place in the league table, qualifying for the playoffs where they would be defeated in the semifinals by Maccabi Tel Aviv. B.C. Haifa’s Stanley Brundy lead the league in rebounds per game and Corey Gaines would lead the league in assists per game.

B.C. Haifa were able to maintain the same form for the 2001–02 Premier League season as the team would again finish fourth place and would qualify for the playoffs once more. Once again, B.C. Haifa weren’t able to overpower Maccabi Tel Aviv as they would suffer elimination once more by the perennial champions in the semifinals. Stanley Brundy and Corey Gaines would yet again lead the league in their respective rebounds and assists per game categories.

Despite having success the past two seasons, the 2002–03 season would be one that B.C. Haifa would struggle as the club would finish with a disappointing eleventh place in the league, failing to qualify for the playoffs. Corey Gaines would once again become the few bright spots on the team as he would once again lead the league in assists per game.

B.C. Haifa would undergo a name change from B.C. Haifa to B.C. Haifa/Nesher. While having shown previous success a few seasons ago, the club would begin to experience financial difficulties. The 2003–04 season would be a reflection of this as the club would yet again finish eleventh place, failing to make the playoffs and just avoiding relegation.

The financial difficulties would lead the club to a crashing end as the team would finish the 2004–05 season in twelfth place and ultimately relegation to the National League. The club fate would ultimately see them fold and the last rights of the club would be sold to Bnei HaSharon. The overall merger of Maccabi Haifa and Hapoel Haifa would become a failure that caused a drastic impact of the two clubs as they would later reform into different entities.

In an attempt to salvage the club, former officials decided to change the name of the team's previous second team Maccabi Bat Galim to Maccabi Haifa/Bat Galim officially restoring to Maccabi Haifa name that had been dormant for six years, the main goals was to restore the club's glory days. Maccabi Haifa would have to restart in the third tier, they would achieve promotion back to the National League in 2007. That same year saw Maccabi Haifa being purchased by American businessman Jeffrey Rosen, who invested heavily in the club. In 2008, Maccabi Haifa were officially promoted back to the Premier League. 

Jeffrey Rosen investment of the club would show in the 2008–09 season as the team would finish second place in the league. Doron Perkins would become a key piece to the team's success as he would take the 2009 League MVP and would be selected into the 2009 All-Premier League First Team. Davon Jefferson would also excel well as he would win the 2009 Premier League 6th Man of the Year award. Maccabi Haifa coach Avi Ashkenazi would win 2009 Premier League Coach of the Year. The team would reach the Premier League finals before falling once more to champions Maccabi Tel Aviv. The team would also reach the finals of the 2009 State Cup would they would fall to winners Hapoel Holon.

Maccabi Haifa would continue their success as the team would finish third place in the 2009–10 regular season. Despite this, Maccabi Haifa would end up getting upset in the quarterfinals against Elitzur Netanya.

2010s

The 2010–11 season would see Maccabi Haifa return to international competition in the form of the 2010–11 FIBA EuroChallenge. Maccabi Haifa would advance out the qualifying round defeating French side Paris-Levallois, they would finish second place in the group in the regular season and qualify for the Round of 16, however, the team would finish third place in their group and fail to make the quarterfinals. Maccabi Haifa were unable to continue their success the past two seasons as the club would finish the league season with a disappointing ninth place finish. 

Maccabi Haifa would end up hitting yet another dead end as the team would yet again have another disappointing season as the team would finish the 2011–12 in eleventh place, the team would just narrowly avoid relegation. The season would help show glimpses of what would be a memorable next season to come.

The 2012–13 Premier League season would become one of the most memorable seasons in Maccabi Haifa history as the team would finish the regular season in second place. Gal Mekel would become one of the biggest pieces of Maccabi Haifa’s success as he would become the 2012 League MVP and be elected into the 2012 All-Premier League First Team. His teammate, Pat Calathes would also achieve 2012 All-Premier League First Team recommendation as well. The team's success in 2012 would lead to Brad Greenberg winning the 2012 Premier League Coach of the Year. The team's success would lead them all the way to the Premier League final we’re they would once again meet rivals Maccabi Tel Aviv. Maccabi Haifa would win their first-ever championship in franchise history defeating Maccabi Tel Aviv. Pat Calathes would become the hero for Maccabi Haifa as he would win the 2012 Premier League Finals MVP.

The expectations were high for the defending champions of the Premier League as the Maccabi Haifa would participate in the 2013–14 EuroCup. Maccabi Haifa would finish second place in their group in the regular season, this would allow them to advance to the Round of 32, were they would end up finishing last place in their group and thus elimination from the EuroCup. Maccabi Haifa would continue their league success as the team would finish third place in the regular season. Maccabi Haifa would once again have a League MVP as Donta Smith would win the 2014 Premier League MVP and 2014 All-Premier League First Team selection. Brian Randle would become one of the best defensive players in the league as he would win the 2014 Premier League Defensive Player of the Year. The team would once again make the Premier League finals, we’re they meet once more against Maccabi Tel Aviv, the results, however, we’re different as Maccabi Tel Aviv would come out victorious. Maccabi Haifa’s Dagan Yivzori would end up winning the 2014 Premier League Finals MVP.

Maccabi Haifa would continue their string of playoff appearances as the team would finish the 2014-15 season in fifth place. Ike Ofoegbu would be selected in the 2015 All-Premier League First Team. Maccabi Haifa were unable to reach the finals once more as the team would be eliminated in the quarterfinals against Hapoel Eilat.

Maccabi Haifa showed glimpses of their previous success as the team would finish with a third place finish in 2015-16 the regular season. Gregory Vargas would be one of the biggest focuses of the team as he would win the 2016 Premier League Defensive Player of the Year. Maccabi Haifa would once more see disappointment in the playoffs as they would be once again eliminated in the quarterfinals, this time against eventual league champions Maccabi Rishon LeZion.

The 2016-17 would be considered as a rollercoaster for Maccabi Haifa. The team finished eighth place in the league, qualifying for the playoffs once more. One of the most important players was John DiBartolomeo who became a star in the league as he would win 2017 Premier League MVP and also selected into the 2017 All-Premier League First Team. Gregory Vargas would also once again win the 2017 Premier League Defensive Player of the Year. Despite being the eighth seed, Maccabi Haifa managed to make it all the way to the Premier League Finals were they would fall to eventual champions Hapoel Jerusalem.

Despite everything going well for Maccabi Haifa in the 2010s, the 2017-18 season would signal the downfall of the team once more. Maccabi Haifa would have a disappointing season and would end up finishing twelfth place in the league. The team lost the tie-breaker against Maccabi Rishon LeZion and thus were ultimately relegated to the National League for the first time since 2008. Maccabi Haifa’s stay in the National League would be short-lived as the team would quickly be promoted back to the Premier League the following season.

The 2019-20 saw Maccabi Haifa back in the Premier League, the team would return to the playoffs as they would finish sixth place in the league. James Young helped lead the way as he would lead the league in Points per Game for the campaign. Maccabi Haifa we’re quickly eliminated in the Round of 16 against Maccabi Rishon LeZion.

2020s

Maccabi Haifa were unable to achieve success in the 2020-21 season. Maccabi Haifa made their return to international competition by joining the Balkan International Basketball League the team would end up finishing their regular season group in dead last as the team went winless and eliminated from the competition. The Premier League didn’t go any better as the team would finish the season in twelfth place and ultimately relegation back to the National League once more.

Arena

Between 2010 and 2012, the team played temporary at Ramot Itzhak Hall in Nesher, because the home arena Romema was renovated and its capacity was increased to 5,000 seats.

Honours and records

Israeli Basketball Premier League

Champions (1): 2012–2013
Runner up (3) : 2008-2009, 2013-14, 2016-17

Israeli Basketball State Cup

Runner up (4) : 1970–1971, 1984–1985, 2008-2009, 2012-2013

Lower division competitions 
Liga Artzit / National League 
Winners: 1956, 1961, 1974 , 1980 , 2019

Roster

Current roster

Squad changes for the 2022–2023 season

In

Out

Notable players

 Koren Amisha
 Netanel Artzi 
 Assaf Barnea
 Avi Ben-Chimol 
 Moshe Bitter 
 Oz Blayzer
 Michael Brisker
 Chaim Buchbinder 
 Adi Gordon 
 Roi Huber
 Rani Isaac 
 Elishay Kadir 
 Ze'ev Kagan
 Itzhak Kisilov 
 Uri Kokia 
 Ido Kozikaro 
 Tom Maayan
 Benny Marcus 
 Gal Mekel 
 Moshe Mizrahi
 Gabi Neumark
 Shlomo Peled 
 Gur Porat 
 Ari Rosenberg 
 Moran Roth 
 Itzhak Rubinstein 
 Doron Shefa 
 Amit Simhon
 Tomer Steinhauer 
 Meir Tapiro 
 Dagan Yivzori 
 Yiftach Ziv
 Sylven Landesberg
 Roman Rubinshteyn
 Roman Sorkin
 Chanan Colman 
 Alexey Chubrevich 
 Daniel Koperberg
 Dror Hajaj 
 David Blatt 
 Stanley Brundy 
 Cory Carr 
 Glenn Consor 
 John DiBartolomeo 
 Ryan Lexer 
 David Mastbaum 
 Willie Sims
 Chris Smith
 James Terry
 Willy Workman
 Mark Dean 
 Marko Bulić 
 Rigoberto Mendoza
 Pat Calathes
 Andrew Kennedy 
 Orlando Méndez-Valdez 
 Alex Pérez-Kaufmann 
 Paul Stoll 
 Ike Ofoegbu 
 Trevor Gaskins
 Ángel Rodríguez
 Mamadou N'Diaye 
 Petar Arsić 
 Mlađan Šilobad 
 Demetrius Alexander 
 Gary Alexander
 Andrew Andrews 
 Rashid Atkins
 Joe Binion
 Brandon Bowman
 Michael Cobbins
 Greg Cook
 Keron DeShields
 Chris Dowe 
 Corey Gaines 
 Will Graves
 Steve Hood 
 Jermaine Jackson 
 Davon Jefferson 
 Kalin Lucas
 Devyn Marble
 Tony Mitchell
 Randy Owens 
 Doron Perkins 
 Kevinn Pinkney
 Carlos Powell 
 Brian Randle 
 Jason Rich 
 Frank Robinson 
 René Rougeau 
 Ben Strong 
 James Thomas 
 Bernard Thompson
 Tyler Wilkerson
 James Young 
 Néstor Colmenares
 Gregory Vargas
 Donta Smith

Accomplishments per season

  
FR = First Round 
SR = Second Round
R16 = Round of 16 
QF = Quarter-Final
SF = Semi-Final 
DNP = Do not play 
DNQ = Do not qualify

Maccabi Haifa in European competitions

First Qualified

In the 1971/1972 season, Maccabi Haifa participated for the first time in European competitions when it qualified for  the FIBA European Cup Winners' Cup due to having qualified for the Israeli Final cup 1970/1971. Maccabi was eliminated after the first round, in which it lost to the French side Denain Voltaire .

Second Qualified and First Win

In the 1985/1986 season, it qualified again for the FIBA European Cup Winners' Cup due to having qualified for the Israeli Final cup 1984/1985 in the first round, and defeated ENAD Ayiou Dometiou from Cyprus after winning in both games, in the first leg 125-58 and in the second leg 94–55. In the second round it lost to Jugoplastika from the Republic of Yugoslavia

Korać Cup

In the 1987/1986 season, it qualified for the first time for the Korać Cup after defeating Achilleas Kaimakli from Cyprus 217–90 in aggregate (96-49 in the first leg, and 121–41 in the second leg). In the second round it defeated ASVEL Basket in the first leg, but lost in the second and was eliminated.

In the 1992/1993 season, the team once again participated in the Korać Cup, and qualified directly for the second round, and was eliminated by Gravelines-Dunkerque from France after it lost in both legs (86-90 loss at home, and 60–81 away).

Group stage

In the 1999/2000 season it qualified for the first time for the main tournament after beating the Cypriot team Keravnos (draw 67–67 in the first game away, and a 57–66 win away). Maccabi was a draw for Group C  with Pallacanestro Reggiana from Italy and Nikol Fert from Macedonia (KK Beopetrol from the Republic of Yugoslavia withdrew from the competition). The team finished in first place with three wins against one loss and qualified for the quarterfinals, where they lost to Italian Pepsi Rimini 127–139 in aggregate.

EuroChallenge

In the 2010/2011 season, the team participated in the EuroChallenge Cup (which was the 3rd-tier level men's professional continental club basketball competition in Europe). It qualified for the  main tournament by beating Paris-Levallois Basket in the qualifying round after it lost 63–75 in the first leg in Paris, and in the second leg won 89-66 (152-141 in aggregate). The team was placed in Group B with Skyliners Frankfurt from Germany, BK Ventspils from Latvia, and the Ukraine team Khimik Yuzhne. The team finished in second place with three wins against three losses and qualified for the last 16 stage where the teams was drawn with the Israeli team Barak Netanya, Academic Sofia from Bulgaria, and Spartak Saint Petersburg from Russia, and was eliminated after it finished in third place with two wins and four losses.

EuroCup

After winning a historic championship the previous season and choosing not to participate in the Euroleague qualifiers in the 2013/2014 season, the team participated in the EuroCup in the regular season and was drawn into Group G with the Russian Unicas Kazan, Banvit Bandırma from Turkey, VEF Rīga (Latvia), MZT Skopje (Macedonia), and also Kalev/Vremo (Estonia).

The team finished in second place with six wins against four losses and qualified for the last 32 stage where the teams was drawn with the Montepaschi Siena from Italy, BC Khimki Moscow Region from Russia, and the Czech team ERA Nymburk. The team won twice (including an 86-66 vs Montepaschi Siena, but was eliminated due to its head-to-head record.

Balkan League

12 teams from Israel joined the league, after suspension of the league due to the COVID-19 pandemic. The team was drawn into Norte Group B with Ironi Nahariya and Hapoel Gilboa Galil; it lost against Ironi Nahariya, and was eliminated.

Matches against NBA teams

Notes

References

External links
Official website

 
Haifa B.C.
Basketball
Haifa B.C.
Israeli Basketball Premier League teams
1953 establishments in Israel